Biran may refer to:

People
 Avraham Biran (born 1909-2008), Israeli archaeologist 
 Dror Biran (born 1977), Israeli pianist
 Itamar Biran (born 1998), Israeli alpine ski racer
 Maine de Biran (born 1766-1824), French philosopher 
 Michal Biran (born 1978), Israeli politician
 Misbach Yusa Biran (born 1933-2012), Indonesian writer
 Paul Biran (born 1969), Israeli mathematician 
 Shahar Biran (born 1998), Israeli tennis player
 Shergo Biran (born 1979), German football player

Places
 Birán, a town in Cuba
 Biran Gali Union Council, a Union Council in Khyber Pakhtunkhwa, Pakistan
 Biran, Gers, a commune of France in the Gers department
 Biran, Iran, a village in West Azerbaijan Province, Iran
 Biran, Bhiwani a village in the Bhiwani District of the Indian state of Haryana
 Biran, Hanumangarh a village in the Hanumangarh District of the Indian state of Rajasthan

Other

 Biran tree, the Wild Mangosteen (Garcinia indica)